was the Japanese concubine of Sun Yat-sen, the founder of the Republic of China.

Asada was born in Shizuoka Prefecture, Japan, and spoke both fluent Chinese and English. She encountered Sun when she worked as a maid in Sun's house in Yokohama. She died in 1902, and Sun married Kaoru Otsuki in 1904.

References

1882 births
1902 deaths
People from Shizuoka Prefecture
Sun Yat-sen family